The Phelan Medal is an annual award given in the Sydney AFL. It is awarded to best and fairest player of the Premier Division competition each year and is named after former NSW League official James (Jim) E. Phelan (1860–1939). It is seen to be the Sydney AFL equivalent to the Brownlow Medal.

The best and fairest player in the Sydney League was first presented an unnamed award in 1926. In 1932, Mr Aub D.S. Provan, the NSW Australian National Football League president donated a trophy titled the "Provan Trophy" to the winner. The name was changed to the Phelan Medal in 1937.

Due to the cancellation of the 2021 AFL Sydney season due to the COVID-19 outbreak across Greater Sydney, the medal was not awarded in 2021.

Phelan Medallists

Multiple winners
The following players have won the Phelan Medal multiple times.

Phelan Medal wins by club

See also

Sydney AFL
Mostyn Medal
Bob Skilton Medal
Brett Kirk Medal
Kevin Sheedy Medal

References

External links
 

Awards established in 1926
Australian rules football in New South Wales
Australian rules football awards
1926 establishments in Australia